HMY may refer to:
 Hairmyres railway station, in Scotland
 HMY Airways, a defunct Canadian airline
 Seosan Air Base, in South Korea
 Southern Guiyang Miao language, spoken in China
 His or Her Majesty's Yacht, a ship prefix; see Her Majesty's Ship